Undulambia fulvitinctalis is a moth in the family Crambidae. It was described by George Hampson in 1897. It is found in Peru.

References

Moths described in 1897
Musotiminae